The 1901 Boston College football team was an American football team that represented Boston College as an independent during the 1901 college football season. In its fourth and final season under head coach John Dunlop, the team compiled a 1–8 record. Joe Kenney was the team captain.

Schedule

References

Boston College
Boston College Eagles football seasons
Boston College football
1900s in Boston